The Lac de Monteynard-Avignonet (Lake of Monteynard-Avignonet) is an artificial water reservoir for the Électricité de France (EDF) power station on the river Drac. It belongs to the department of Isère. It is bounded by the canyons of the Drac and Ebron.

The lake was created in 1961, when the 145-metre-high dam was built. The lake is 10 kilometres long; in some places it is up to 300 metres wide.

This lake is often windy and wavy. It is considered to be one of the best places for windsurfing and kitesurfing in Europe. It is also an important site for fishing, as it has a great variety of fish species. Swimming in the lake is permitted.

The lake is bordered by the following municipalities: Avignonet, Cognet, Marcieu, Mayres-Savel, Monteynard, La Motte-Saint-Martin, Roissard,  Saint-Arey, Sinard, Treffort.

The bridges

In 2007 two simple suspension bridges were built across the Drac and Ebron.  The bridges are 220 and 180 metres long, respectively, and used 1200 metres of cable.  Depending on the level of the water in the lake, the Drac bridge is 45–85 metres high above the lake.  Construction of the bridges was achieved with the help of helicopters.

The bridge design was based on traditional simple suspension bridges used in the Andes (see Inca rope bridge) and Himalayas to cross deep gorges from rim to rim.  Locally, the Drac and Ebron bridges are known as passerelles himalayennes (French, "Himalayan footbridges").  Like some traditional bridges of this type, the Drac and Ebron bridges are stabilized with cables from below the deck.

The bridges allow hiking and biking from Matheysine to Trièves, as part of a 30 km route around the lake.

See also
 List of notable pedestrian bridges

References

External links

Monteynard
Les passerelles himalayennes
Passerelles himalayennes

Tourism in Auvergne-Rhône-Alpes
Monteynard Avignonet
Simple suspension bridges